Bernard Charles Wrightson (born June 25, 1944) is a former Olympic and Pan American Games gold medalist for the United States. The Denver, Colorado, native was primarily a three-meter springboard diver, but he also won a national AAU championship on the ten-meter platform. Between 1964 and 1968, Bernie Wrightson captured a total of eight USA Open titles in the sport of diving.  He represented US at the 1968 Summer Olympics in Mexico City, where he received a gold medal in Springboard Diving.

Biography 
Wrightson was raised in Denver, Colorado, where he attended Morey Junior High and Denver East High School. He attended Arizona State University; in 1966 he was the National Collegiate Athletic Association champion on both the one and three-meter springboard. The following season, Wrightson won a gold medal at the Pan-American Games in Winnipeg. During the 1968 Games of Mexico City, Bernie moved in front during the first round – and never looked back; he set an Olympic record of 170 points to win the gold medal.

Awards
He was inducted into the International Swimming Hall of Fame in Fort Lauderdale, Florida, in 1984.

See also
 List of members of the International Swimming Hall of Fame

References

1944 births
Living people
Divers at the 1968 Summer Olympics
Olympic gold medalists for the United States in diving
American male divers
Medalists at the 1968 Summer Olympics
Pan American Games gold medalists for the United States
Pan American Games medalists in diving
Universiade medalists in diving
Divers at the 1967 Pan American Games
Universiade silver medalists for the United States
Medalists at the 1965 Summer Universiade
Medalists at the 1967 Pan American Games